Manon Bornholdt (born 20 August 1950) is a German athlete. She competed in the women's long jump at the 1968 Summer Olympics.

References

1950 births
Living people
Athletes (track and field) at the 1968 Summer Olympics
German female long jumpers
German pentathletes
Olympic athletes of West Germany
Place of birth missing (living people)